Jacksonville City Nights is the seventh studio album by American alternative country singer-songwriter Ryan Adams, released on September 27, 2005 on Lost Highway. The album is Adams' second with The Cardinals, and the second in a trilogy of albums released in a seven-month timespan during 2005. By 2007, the album had sold 100,000 copies in the United States and 158,000 worldwide. The album was recorded live in the studio, without overdubs.  The title is a reference to Adams' hometown of Jacksonville, North Carolina, which has been referenced throughout his career.

Several limited American releases contained a DVD entitled September (which was originally intended to be the title of the album), which featured a 20 minute documentary about the band on the road and in the studio. Bassist Catherine Popper is featured in the photograph on the album cover.

Reception
The album so far has a score of 72 out of 100 from Metacritic based on "generally favorable reviews". Spin gave it a B+ and said the album "reminds you why Adams was once a big deal." NME gave it a score of seven out of ten and said, "Adams could clearly make use of an editor here--but you can't possibly hate an album that uses pedal-steel on every track." Tiny Mix Tapes gave it a score of three-and-a-half stars out of five and said, "As with most Adams records, the fact that some of the songs made the cut is perplexing." However, Blender gave it three stars out of five and said, "It's the sound of a New Yorker coming home for a breath of country air." Prefix Magazine gave it an average review and said, "Perhaps Adams is just earning cheap sympathy with his strained, tour-weary voice, or maybe it’s just too thrilling to hear him revisit Gram, but Jacksonville City Lights [sic] does seem to come by its sound honestly."

Track listing

Chart positions

Album

Musicians

The Cardinals
Ryan Adams - vocals, acoustic guitar, piano
J.P. Bowersock - electric guitars
Catherine Popper - bass, piano, background vocals
Brad Pemberton - drums, percussion
Jon Graboff - pedal steel, background vocals

Other musicians
Claudia Chopek: Violin.
David Gold: Violin & Viola.
Bob Hoffnar: Pedal steel.
Byron Isaacs: Background vocals.
Norah Jones:  Piano & vocals.
Julia Kent: Cello.
Joe McGinty: Piano.
Michael Panes: Violin.
Johnny T: Drums.
Glenn Patscha: Piano & background vocals.

The Nashville String Machine
The Nashville String Machine perform on the song "My Heart Is Broken" and are:
Bergen White: Arranger and conductor.
Violins: Carl Gorodetsky, Pamela Sixfin, Conni Ellisor, Allan Umstead, David Angell, Cathy Umstead & Mary Kathryn Vanosdale.
Violas: Kris Wilkinson, Gary Vanosdale & Jim Grosjean.
Cellos: Carole Rabinowitz & Bob Mason.

References

External links
 

Ryan Adams albums
2005 albums
Lost Highway Records albums